Chris Beetem (born Christopher Lapinski;  August 8, 1969) is an American film and television actor. He is known for his roles in films such as Black Hawk Down, Every Day and Mr. Popper's Penguins. Beetem is also known for his roles in As the World Turns, One Tree Hill, JAG and Pan Am.

Career
Beetem attended Philadelphia High School for Creative and Performing Arts.

Beetem played Jordan Sinclair on the daytime soap opera As the World Turns from 2004 to 2005, serial killer Tate Harmon on One Life to Live from February to August 2007, and Congressman Chris Rawlings on the prime time drama Pan Am from 2011 to 2012.

Filmography

Film

Television

References

External links

American male film actors
American male soap opera actors
American male television actors
Male actors from Philadelphia
1969 births
Living people